Chyliza erudita is a species of rust flies in the family Psilidae.

References

External links

 

Psilidae
Articles created by Qbugbot
Insects described in 1920